Cordyla flaviceps is a Palearctic species of  'fungus gnat' in the family Mycetophilidae.The type-locality is Copenhagen (Denmark). 
C. flavicepsis a mycetophage associated with Russula and Lactarius.

References

External links 
 Images representing  Cordyla flaviceps at BOLD

Mycetophilidae
Nematoceran flies of Europe
Taxa named by Rasmus Carl Stæger
Diptera of Europe